The 2nd Jersey Road Race was a Formula One motor race held on 29 April 1948 at the St. Helier Circuit, in Saint Helier, Jersey. The 55-lap race was won by Bob Gerard in an ERA B-Type, setting fastest lap in the process. George Abecassis finished second in a Maserati 6CM, and Reg Parnell was third in a Maserati 4CL. B. Bira started from pole position in another Maserati 4CL but finished fourth following a succession of pit stops for tyres, oil and fuel.

Results

References

Jersey Road Race
Sport in Jersey
Saint Helier